Land of Freedom may refer to:
 Azadistan, meaning "Land of Freedom", state in the Iranian province of Azarbaijan for several months in 1920
 Boyacá Department, Colombia, nicknamed "Land of Freedom" as the site of a major battle in Colombia's struggle for independence from Spain
 Zale'n-gam, meaning "Land of Freedom", proposed state for the Kuki people in eastern Bangladesh, northeastern India, and western Myanmar

Music
"I Ain't Got Time to Tarry", 1858 song by American blackface minstrel composer Dan Emmett, also known as "The Land of Freedom" 
Snowy White (album), 1984 album by English guitarist Snowy White, released as Land of Freedom in some markets
"Land of Freedom", 1994 song by British rock band Atomic Rooster on their album Headline News
"Land of Freedom", 1990s track by French electronic music act Transwave

See also
Land of Liberty, 1939 American documentary film
Freedomland (disambiguation)
List of freedom indices, for rankings of countries on various freedoms